Slowly Slowly are an Australian pop punk and indie rock band from Melbourne, Victoria. The band consists of Ben Stewart (lead vocals, guitar), Patrick Murphy (drums), Albert Doan (guitar), and Alex Quayle (bass guitar). They released their debut album Chamomile in 2016.

Slowly Slowly have performed at festivals such as Beyond the Valley, Splendour in the Grass, and Party In The Paddock. They have also supported Red Hot Chili Peppers and Amy Shark on their Australian national tours.

Career
In June 2015, Slowly Slowly released their debut single "Empty Lungs". This was followed by the singles "New York, Paris" and "PMTWGR" in 2016. The band released their debut studio album Chamomile in July 2016.

In May 2018, Slowly Slowly released their second studio album St. Leonards which spawned three singles; "Aliens", "Alchemy" and "Ten Leaf Clover".

In May 2019, Slowly Slowly covered "Skinny Love" by Bon Iver for Triple J's Like a Version.

In January 2020, the group announced their third full-length album Race Car Blues, to be released on 28 February 2020. They released the album's title track on that same day.

On 25 January 2020, the band were announced as having placed at No. 57 in the Triple J Hottest 100, 2019, with the single "Jellyfish"; This was Slowly Slowly's first ever entry in the annual countdown.

In August 2021, the band cancelled the remainder of their Race Car Blues tour dates and said plans for the band are "on hold" due to health challenges currently being faced by frontman Ben Stewart.

In July 2022, the band announced the forthcoming release of Daisy Chain, scheduled for release in November 2022.

Discography

Studio albums

Reissued albumss

Singles

Notes

Awards and nominations

AIR Awards
The Australian Independent Record Awards (commonly known as the AIR Awards) is an annual awards night to recognise, promote and celebrate the success of Australia's independent music sector.

! 
|-
! scope="row"| 2021
| Race Car Blues
| Best Independent Rock Album or EP
| 
| 
|}

APRA Awards
The APRA Awards are held in Australia and New Zealand by the Australasian Performing Right Association to recognise songwriting skills, sales and airplay performance by its members annually. Slowly Slowly has been nominated for one award.

! 
|-
! scope="row"| 2020
| "Jellyfish"
| Most Performed Rock Work of the Year
| 
| 
|}

J Award
The J Awards are an annual series of Australian music awards that were established by the Australian Broadcasting Corporation's youth-focused radio station Triple J. They commenced in 2005.

! 
|-
! scope="row"| 2018
| Themselves
| Unearthed Artist of the Year
| 
| 
|}

Rolling Stone Australia Awards
The Rolling Stone Australia Awards are awarded annually in January or February by the Australian edition of Rolling Stone magazine for outstanding contributions to popular culture in the previous year.

! 
|-
| 2022
| "Blueprint"
| Best Single
| 
| 
|-

References

2015 establishments in Australia
Australian pop punk groups
Musical quartets